Grace Steven (born 19 February 1995) is a Papua New Guinean footballer who plays as a forward. She has been a member of the Papua New Guinea women's national team.

References

1995 births
Living people
Women's association football forwards
Papua New Guinean women's footballers
Papua New Guinea women's international footballers